Aineh Deh (also Romanized as Ā’īneh Deh and Āyneh Deh; also known as ‘Ainadeh and Aynadei) is a village in Jirandeh Rural District, Amarlu District, Rudbar County, Gilan Province, Iran. At the 2006 census, its population was 150, in 54 families.

References 

Populated places in Rudbar County